Raimondo, Prince della Torre e Tasso, 2nd Duke of Castel Duino (16 March 1907 – 17 March 1986) was the son of Alessandro, 1st Duke of Castel Duino and Princess Marie de Ligne.

Duke of Castel Duino
His father was naturalised in Italy in 1923 with the title Prince della Torre e Tasso and was also created Duke of Castel Duino. Raimundo succeeded as the 2nd duke of Castel Duino following the death of his father on 11 March 1937.

Marriage and issue
He was married to Princess Eugénie of Greece and Denmark on 28 November 1949 in Athens. They divorced on 11 May 1965, having had one son who succeeded Raimondo as the 3rd duke of Castel Duino.
Carlo Alessandro, 3rd Duke of Castel Duino (born 1952)

Ancestry

References
The Peerage

1907 births
1986 deaths
Princes of Thurn und Taxis
Dukes of Castel Duino
People from Duino
Italian Roman Catholics